Jessamine may refer to:

People
 a variant of Jasmine (given name)
 Jessamine Buxton, Australian artist
 Lady Jessamine Harmsworth, British noblewoman
Jessamine Hoagland (1879-1957), American businesswoman
 Jessamine Shumate (1902–1990), American artist, historian and cartographer
 Jessamine S. Whitney, American health professional
 Jessamyn Duke, American mixed martial artist
 Jessamyn Fairfield, American physicist
 Jessamyn Lovell, American artist
 Jessamyn Rodriguez, Canadian-American entrepreneur
 Jessamyn Sauceda, Mexican athlete
 Jessamyn Stanley, American yoga teacher
 Jessamyn West (disambiguation)

Plants
 Cestrum, a genus of flowering plants
 Cestrum nocturnum, night-blooming jessamine
Cestrum parqui, willow-leaved jessamine (green cestrum)
 Jasminum, a genus of shrubs and vines in the olive family
 Gardenia jasminoides, cape jessamine
 Gelsemium rankinii, Rankin's jessamine or swamp jessamine
 Gelsemium sempervirens, yellow jessamine or Carolina jessamine
 Murraya paniculata, orange jessamine

Other uses
 Jessamine (band), a 1990s post-rock band from Ohio
 Jessamine Stakes, an American flat Thoroughbred horse race for two-year-old filles held annually at Keeneland in Lexington, Kentucky
 Jessamine County, Kentucky, United States
 Jessamine, Kentucky, an unincorporated community in Jessamine County, Kentucky, United States
 "Jesamine" (originally "When Jesamine Goes"), popular UK song recorded by The Casuals